Fructilactobacillus is a genus of lactic acid bacteria.

Phylogeny
The current taxonomy is based on the List of Prokaryotic names with Standing in Nomenclature and the phylogeny is based on whole-genome sequences.

References

Lactobacillaceae
Bacteria genera